The Deutsche Luftfahrtforschungsanstalt (English: German Aeronautical Research Institute, LFA, also known as the Hermann Göring Research Institute) was a secret German facility for airframe, aeroengine, and aircraft weapons testing during the Second World War. It was Germany's "most advanced and extensive [aviation] research establishment, outside of the existing Erprobungsstelle network of military aviation evaluation facilities, themselves headquartered at Rechlin.

Located near Völkenrode, on the western outskirts of Braunschweig (Brunswick), near what became the Inner German Border. it was a  site begun in October 1935. The first wind tunnel was begun in November 1936. Most of the sixty buildings, scattered around the site, did not exceed treetop height, and all were well-camouflaged, to reduce the chance of them being detected by aerial reconnaissance and to avoid making them targets, as the wind tunnels of the Deutsche Versuchsanstalt für Luftfahrt (DVL) in Adlershof (near Berlin) or the Aerodynamische Versuchsanstalt (AVA, part of today's DLR agency) at the University of Göttingen were.

The buildings were in five groups. The Institute of Aerodynamics had five wind tunnels, while the Institute of Gas Dynamics had its own high-speed tunnel; both were at the southern end of the campus. The static testing station of the Institute of Strength Properties was to the west; the Institute of Engine Research, the east. Weapons research was done by the Institute of Kinematics in a -long tunnel in the northwest corner. These were accompanied by administration buildings, a canteen, a telephone exchange, guard houses, generators, and other facilities.

To help reduce the risk of detection, there were no railway lines in, nor overhead power lines, nor any chimneys; and uniquely for an aviation research facility of its time in Germany, no runways, taxiways or hardstands for active aviation operations; just about all of the facilitiy's infrastructure needs were supplied underground from Braunschweig, including steam heat.

In addition, there were four hundred houses in Völkenrode for the 1,500 or so workers and scientists.

Each of the wind tunnels at LFA was given an "A" number. It was driven by a pair of  DC motors, and fitted with interferometer and striation gear for study of flow patterns. Begun in 1937, it first ran in 1939. It did, however, suffer with problems of vibration, leading the research teams to rely on a Rheinmetall-Börsig F25 free-flight research rocket with models mounted in the nose. The A9 building housed a pair of supersonic wind tunnels, each driven by a  motor, with a maximum speed of Mach 1.5, but a test section diameter of only .

Along with direct aerodynamic research, LFA did testing on materials (though not, apparently, of parts) and on aircraft engines. The engine work included testing of turbine and turbine blade shapes, ceramic turbine blades, cooling of turbine blades (including liquid cooling), bearings, detonation, and several types of heat exchangers, among other things.

The test centre assisted the BMW firm in developing the factory-produced forward cowling — which had the engine's oil cooler integrated into it from the beginning — for the Bavarian firm's BMW 801 fourteen-cylinder radial engine used in many German Luftwaffe military aircraft, most importantly the Fw 190A; trials indicated it was possible to reduce drag enough to save , as well as to maximize pressure build-up to assist cooling.  It also helped in development of the pioneering Argus As 014 pulsejet used in the V-1.  In collaboration with Göttingen and DVL (Berlin-Adlershof), it also contributed to the development of the swept wing (what Germans called Pfeilflüge, or "arrow wing").

Among the engine projects worked on at LFA was a toroidal (swing-piston) design by Otto Lutz of Büssing, a concept akin to the Wankel; work was also done by Junkers and Bosch.

LFA remained so secret, the Allied air forces never bombed it.

Postwar, the site was visited by a Ministry of Aircraft Production team led by Roy Fedden.

Notes

Sources
Christopher, John.  The Race for Hitler's X-Planes.  The Mill, Gloucestershire:  History Press, 2013.

External links
 German language page on the LFA facility's history and still-standing buildings
 Google Translate's English language translation of the above link, dated June 14, 2015

Research institutes in Germany
Aviation in Germany
Aviation research institutes
Aeronautics organizations
Organisations based in Braunschweig
1935 establishments in Germany
Organizations established in 1935
Research and development in Nazi Germany
Aerospace research institutes